Johannes Marinus Ludovicus Adrianus Petrus Wirix (born 7 November 1836 – 30 December 1917) was a Dutch naval officer, who had been commander of the Royal Netherlands Navy on the Dutch Gold Coast since 26 July 1871, and who was appointed interim governor by the previous interim governor Jan Albert Hendrik Hugenholz on 17 September 1871. His appointment proved highly controversial with the other colonial administrators on the Gold Coast, who felt passed by. Wirix resigned on 28 October 1871, leaving the interim governorship to the long-time Gold Coast administrator Willem Le Jeune.

Notes

References 
 

1836 births
1917 deaths
Colonial governors of the Dutch Gold Coast